Isoferulic acid is a hydroxycinnamic acid, a type of organic compound. It is an isomer of ferulic acid.

Occurrence in nature 
Isoferulic acid can be found, amongst other compounds, in Lobelia chinensis.

In food 
Ferulic acid is found in pineapple flesh.

References 

Phenol antioxidants
O-methylated hydroxycinnamic acids